Amixetrine (INN) (brand name Somagest; developmental code name CERM-898) is a drug that was formerly marketed in France but is now no longer sold. According to various sources it has been said to be an anti-inflammatory, antidepressant, antispasmodic, anticholinergic, antihistamine, and antiserotonergic, but its definitive indications and pharmacology are unclear. The drug was first synthesized in 1969 and was introduced in France in 1972.

Synthesis

The treatment of isoamyl alcohol (1) with styrene (2)  at -10°C with dropwise addition of tert-Butyl Hypobromite [1611-82-1] gives (2-bromo-1-(isopentyloxy)ethyl)benzene [5452-50-6] (3). Dispalcement of the halogen leaving group by pyrrolidine completes the synthesis of amixetrine (4).

References

Abandoned drugs
Anti-inflammatory agents
Antidepressants
Antispasmodics
Drugs with unknown mechanisms of action
Phenylethanolamine ethers
Pyrrolidines